Thomas Jefferson (June 20, 1920 – December 13, 1986) was an American Dixieland jazz trumpeter, strongly influenced by Louis Armstrong.

Early life
Jefferson was born in Chicago, Illinois in June 1920. He played drums and French horn while young before switching to trumpet. Jefferson professional career began when he was 14, and played with Billie and De De Pierce.

Career 
Jefferson played with Papa Celestin's orchestra in 1936, as well as with New Orleans jazz musicians such as Sidney Desvigne and Armand "Jump" Jackson. In the 1950s, he worked with Johnny St. Cyr, Santo Pecora, and George Lewis. In 1966, Andrew Morgan recruited Jefferson to play lead trumpet for the Young Tuxedo Brass Band. Subsequently, Jefferson led a jazz band which performed at the New Orleans jazz club Maison Bourbon.

Jefferson recorded sparingly as a leader; sessions include dates for Southland Records in the 1960s and Maison Bourbon Records in the 1970s. Jazz critic Scott Yanow called Jefferson "one of the finest trumpeters in New Orleans during the 1950s and 1960s." Jefferson had a cameo as a jazz musician in the film Hard Times (1975).

Death 
Jefferson died in New Orleans, Louisiana, in December 1986.

Discography

As leader
New Orleans at Midnight (Southland Records, LP-229)
Reissued on GHB Records as GHB-129
New Orleans Creole Jazz Band Featuring Thomas Jefferson (Southland Records, LP-234)
Dreaming Down the River to New Orleans (Southland Records, LP-238)
Sleepy Time Down South (Maison Bourbon Records #1)
Hello Dolly (Maison Bourbon Records #9)
Thomas Jefferson From New Orleans (Storyville Records, SLP 131)
Includes material originally recorded for Southland Records, including several titles from Southland LP-229.

As sideman
Paul Barbarin, Paul Barbarin's Bourbon Street Beat (Southland Records, LP-237)
Jim Robinson, Living New Orleans Jazz-1976 (Smoky Mary Phonograph Company, SM 1976 J)
Appeared on 5 of 10 tracks.
Johnny St. Cyr, Johnny St. Cyr And His Hot Five / Paul Barbarin And His Jazz Band (Southland Records, LP-212)
Appeared on tracks with Johnny St. Cyr only.

References

1920 births
1986 deaths
20th-century American musicians
20th-century American male musicians
20th-century trumpeters
21st-century trumpeters
American jazz trumpeters
American male trumpeters
Dixieland jazz musicians
Dixieland trumpeters
Jazz musicians from Illinois
American male jazz musicians
Musicians from Chicago
Southland Records artists